Richard Pate (Pates, Patys) (died 1565) was an English Roman Catholic bishop.

Life
Born in Oxfordshire, he was a nephew of John Longland. He graduated B.A. from Corpus Christi College, Oxford, in 1523. He studied under Juan Luis Vives, at Bruges.

He graduated M.A. in Paris, and was made Archdeacon of Winchester in 1527 and Archdeacon of Lincoln in 1528. He was appointed ambassador to the Emperor Charles V, in 1533. In 1537 he was removed from that position, after he had advocated for the legitimate status of Princess Mary; but he was reinstated in 1540.

He ignored a summons home in late 1540, after letters to him from John Heliar were discovered. Instead, he stayed with the Emperor, travelling to Germany and then Rome. From the Catholic point of view, he became Bishop of Worcester when appointed to the see by Pope Paul III in 1541, on the death of Girolamo Ghinucci, still recognized as the bishop. With Seth Holland, his chaplain, he was the subject of an act of attainder, in 1542.

He attended the sessions of the Council of Trent  in 1547, 1549, and 1551. He remained in exile until the accession of Mary I. He was then consecrated as bishop, in 1554, his attainder having been lifted. In 1559, on the accession of Elizabeth I of England, he was deprived, and then imprisoned in the Tower of London. He died at Leuven, once more in exile.

References

Notes

 
  

Year of birth missing
1565 deaths
Bishops of Worcester
Archdeacons of Winchester (ancient)
Archdeacons of Lincoln
Participants in the Council of Trent
People from Oxfordshire
16th-century English diplomats
16th-century English Roman Catholic bishops
Alumni of Corpus Christi College, Oxford